Sodium magnesium sulfate is a double sulfate of sodium and magnesium. There are a number of different stoichiometries and degrees of hydration with different crystal structures, and many are minerals.
Members include:
Blödite or bloedite: sodium magnesium sulfate tetrahydrate Na2Mg(SO4)2•4H2O
Disodium magnesium disulfate decahydrate Na2Mg(SO4)2•10H2O
Disodium magnesium disulfate hexadecahydrate Na2Mg(SO4)2•16H2O
Konyaite Na2Mg(SO4)2•5H2O
Löweite Na12Mg7(SO4)13•15H2O.
Vanthoffite Na6Mg(SO4)4
Na2Mg2(SO4)3 langbeinite form stable from 569.2 to 624.7°C
Na2Mg2(SO4)3 quenched monoclinic form
Na2Mg3(SO4)4 orthorhombic form
Na2Mg(SO4)2 triclinic form

Salts containing other anions in addition to sulfate
Na2Mg3(OH)2(SO4)4•4H2O
Tychite hexasodium dimagnesium sulfate tetracarbonate Na6Mg2SO4(CO3)4
Uklonskovite NaMgSO4F•2H2O

References

External links

Sulfates
Magnesium compounds
Sodium compounds
Double salts